Željezno Polje is a village in Žepče Municipality, Federacija Bosne i Hercegovine, Bosnia and Herzegovina.

According to the 2013 census, its population was 4,791.

In 2014 there have been huge floods that destroyed about 100 houses. It were Evacuated about 2,000 residents. Many houses are still (January, 2017) not restored.

Population

See also
Žepče
Meokrnje

References

Populated places in Žepče